MicroMacro: Crime City is a cooperative tabletop crime-solving hidden object game designed by Johannes Sich and published in 2020 by Edition Spielwiese. The game received positive reviews and won the Spiel des Jahres in 2021. A sequel to the game, MicroMacro: Crime City – Full House was released in August 2021.

Gameplay
Some are engaged in criminal activities, ranging from petty theft to murder, and it is the goal of the players acting as detectives or private investigators to solve those crimes.

The victim of the crime is depicted, but the crime is not. Each crime is associated with a case that consists of a deck of 5–12 cards with clues, the first of which describes the scene of the crime and victim. Each of the 16 cases have a difficulty rating ranging from one to five stars, and all clues for a case are labeled with a unique icon representing that case. These clues lead to different parts of the map, tracking the victim and potential perpetrator backward and forward in time.

Details such as clothing, decoration, and directionality depicted in the map can be important clues in the game, which may require a "deductive leap" at times.

Sequel
The sequel MicroMacro: Crime City – Full House was published in August 2021. It included a new  map with 16 new cases to solve. The game was described by the publisher as "more complex, sophisticated and, of course, a bit more criminal", but also included icons with each case indicating the appropriateness of the case for younger children.

Reception
MicroMacro: Crime City received positive reviews. Dicebreaker described the game as blending features from puzzle books such as Where's Wally? and mystery-solving board games such as Sherlock Holmes: Consulting Detective. In a review for ICv2, William Niebling commended the box cover art implementing a "sample mini-mystery" as a "brilliant idea" that would enable potential customers in a shop to "experience what the game offers before buying". He also stated that the game would benefit from having included its own tokens for marking sites on the map,  for example tiddly-winks, instead of players having to source their own. 

The game was also commercially successful, and print runs repeatedly sold out for eight months after its release. From late 2020 to mid-February 2021, shipments of the game were delayed or halted as a result of the COVID-19 pandemic.

Awards
MicroMacro: Crime City won the 2021 Spiel des Jahres award and the L'As d'Or Jeu de l'Année. It also won the 2020 Light Game of the Year and Innovative Game awards from the board game fansite Board Game Geek.

References

External links
 MicroMacro: Crime City at Hard Boiled Games
 
 

Board games introduced in 2020
Hidden object games
Murder and mystery board games